The Ring of Gyges  (Gúgou Daktúlios) is a hypothetical magic ring mentioned by the philosopher Plato in Book 2 of his Republic (2:359a–2:360d). It grants its owner the power to become invisible at will. Through the device of the ring, this section of the Republic considers whether a rational, intelligent person who has no need to fear negative consequences for committing an injustice would nevertheless act justly.

The legends
Gyges of Lydia was a historical king, the founder of the Mermnad dynasty of Lydian kings. Various ancient works—the most well-known being The Histories of Herodotus—gave different accounts of the circumstances of his rise to power. All, however, agree in asserting that he was originally a subordinate of King Candaules of Lydia, that he killed Candaules and seized the throne, and that he had either seduced Candaules' Queen before killing him, married her afterwards, or both.

In Glaucon's recounting of the myth, an unnamed ancestor of Gyges was a shepherd in the service of the ruler of Lydia. After an earthquake, a chasm was revealed in a mountainside where he was feeding his flock. Entering the chasm, he discovered that it was in fact a tomb with a bronze horse containing a corpse, larger than that of a man, who wore a golden ring, which he then pocketed. He discovered that by adjusting the ring, he gained the power of invisibility. He then arranged to become one of the king's messengers as to the status of the flocks. Arriving at the palace, he used his new power of invisibility to seduce the queen, and with her help, murder the king, and become king of Lydia himself.

The role of the legend in Republic
In Republic, the tale of the ring of Gyges is described by the character of Glaucon, the brother of Plato. Glaucon asks whether any man could be so virtuous that he may resist the temptation of killing, robbing, raping, or generally doing injustice to whomever he pleased if he could do so remaining undetected. Glaucon wants Socrates to argue that it is beneficial for us to be just, independent of any consideration for our reputation.

Glaucon posits:

Though his answer to Glaucon's challenge is delayed, Socrates ultimately argues that justice does not derive from this social construct: the man who abused the power of the Ring of Gyges has in fact enslaved himself to his appetites, while the man who chose not to use it remains rationally in control of himself and is therefore happy (Republic 10:612b).

Cultural influences
 Cicero retells the story of Gyges in De Officiis to illustrate his thesis that a wise or good individual bases decisions on a fear of moral degradation as opposed to punishment or negative consequences.  Cicero follows with a discussion of the role of thought experiments in philosophy.  The hypothetical situation in question is complete immunity from punishment of the kind afforded to Gyges by his ring.
 In the first canto of Orlando Innamorato, Galafrone, king of Cathay, gives his son Argalia a ring which makes the bearer invisible when carried in one's mouth and which protects against enchantment when worn on one's finger.
 Jean-Jacques Rousseau, in his "sixth walk" from his 1782 Reveries of a Solitary Walker (French: Les Rêveries du promeneur solitaire), cites the Ring of Gyges legend and contemplates how he would use the ring of invisibility himself.
 Alberich's Ring in the Richard Wagner's opera Der Ring des Nibelungen (The Ring of the Nibelung)
 H. G. Wells' The Invisible Man has as its basis a retelling of the tale of the Ring of Gyges.
 The One Ring from J. R. R. Tolkien's The Hobbit and The Lord of the Rings grants invisibility to its wearer but corrupts its owner. Although there is speculation that Tolkien was influenced by Plato's story, a search on "Gyges" and "Plato" in his letters and biography provides no evidence for this.  Unlike Plato's ring, Tolkien's exerts an active malevolent force that necessarily destroys the morality of the wearer.

See also
 Allegorical interpretations of Plato
 Helm of Hades
 Online disinhibition effect

References

External links
Glaukon's Challenge Glaukon's speech from book 2, translated by Cathal Woods (2010).
Plato, Republic Book 2, translated by Benjamin Jowett (1892).
The Ring of Gyges Analysis by Bernard Suzanne (1996).

Platonism
Greek mythology
Mythological clothing
Magic rings
Fiction about invisibility
Individual rings
Thought experiments in ethics
Gyges of Lydia